Oxygonum is a genus of plants in the family Polygonaceae with about 30 species. It is native to eastern parts of Africa and to the Arabian Peninsula.

Description
Species of Oxygonum are annual or perennial herbaceous plants, more rarely shrubs or shrubby. Their leaves are variable between and within species. The inflorescences are long narrow racemes with bundles (fascicles) of flowers, usually one to five, but sometimes up to 15. The flowers are polygamous (i.e. there are male, female and bisexual flowers on the same plant). There are usually five tepals, arranged spirally, fused at the base to form a tube, longer in female flowers than in male ones. The eight stamens are joined at the base, with patches of nectar-bearing tissue at the base of the inner whorl. The fruit is in the form of an achene, usually three-angled, often with rows of spinelike structures.

Taxonomy
The genus Oxygonum was first published in 1819 by Francisco Campderá, who attributed the name to William John Burchell. Oxygonum is placed in the tribe Oxygoneae of the subfamily Polygonoideae; it is the only genus in the tribe. A 2015 molecular phylogenetic study suggested that it was the sister of all the remaining tribes.

Species
, Plants of the World Online accepted the following species:

Oxygonum acetosella Welw.
Oxygonum alatum Burch.
Oxygonum altissimum Germish.
Oxygonum annuum S.Ortiz & Paiva
Oxygonum atriplicifolium (Meisn.) Martelli
Oxygonum auriculatum R.A.Graham
Oxygonum buchananii (Dammer) J.B.Gillett
Oxygonum carnosum R.A.Graham
Oxygonum delagoense Kuntze
Oxygonum dregeanum Meisn.
Oxygonum ellipticum R.A.Graham
Oxygonum fruticosum Dammer ex Milne-Redh.
Oxygonum gramineum R.A.Graham
Oxygonum hastatum S.Ortiz
Oxygonum hirtum Peter
Oxygonum leptopus Mildbr.
Oxygonum limbatum R.A.Graham
Oxygonum lineare De Wild.
Oxygonum litorale R.A.Graham
Oxygonum lobatum R.A.Graham
Oxygonum maculatum R.A.Graham
Oxygonum magdalenae Dammer ex Peter
Oxygonum ovalifolium Robyns & E.Petit
Oxygonum overlaetii Robyns
Oxygonum pachybasis Milne-Redh.
Oxygonum pterocarpum Osborne & Vollesen
Oxygonum quarrei De Wild.
Oxygonum robustum Germish.
Oxygonum sagittatum R.A.Graham
Oxygonum salicifolium Dammer
Oxygonum schliebenii Mildbr.
Oxygonum sinuatum (Hochst. & Steud. ex Meisn.) Dammer
Oxygonum stuhlmannii Dammer
Oxygonum subfastigiatum R.A.Graham
Oxygonum tenerum Milne-Redh.
Oxygonum thulinianum S.Ortiz
Oxygonum wittei Staner

References 

Polygonaceae genera
Polygonoideae